Peter Callanan (29 June 1935 – 11 October 2009) was an Irish Fianna Fáil politician and served as a member of Seanad Éireann from 1997 until his death in 2009.

Born in Clonakilty, County Cork, Callanan was educated in Mount Melleray College, County Waterford. He was a farmer in Innishannon, County Cork.

A member of Cork County Council from 1979 to 2004, He was an unsuccessful candidate at the 1981 general election for the Cork South-West constituency, and was also an unsuccessful candidate at the 1993 Seanad election. Callanan was elected to the 21st Seanad in 1997 by the Agricultural Panel, and re-elected in 2002 to the 22nd Seanad and in 2007 to the 23rd Seanad.

Callanan died on 11 October 2009. He was married to Sheila Callanan and they had six children.

References

1935 births
2009 deaths
Fianna Fáil senators
Irish farmers
Local councillors in County Cork
Members of the 21st Seanad
Members of the 22nd Seanad
Members of the 23rd Seanad